Una Historia de tango (English: The History of Tango) (2000) is a short musical film from Argentina. It is based on a story by Roberto Fontanarrosa.

The film was directed by Hernán Vieytes and stars Ulises Dumont as Rubén Raigal, a singer with a mysterious past. Daniel Miglioranza and Gregory Dayton appear as two friends who are whisked away to a secret nightclub where Rubén sings, reducing everyone to tears.  Backstage they meet him and he tells a tragic story connected with Japan and the tango.

External links

2000 films
Argentine short films
Argentine musical films
2000s musical films
2000s Argentine films